Joan Ryan may refer to:

 Joan Ryan (politician) (born 1955), British politician 
 Joan Ryan (actress), American actress and singer